Ljubomir Đurković (13 November 1952 – 29 November 2022) was a Montenegrin author and poet.

Education
Đurković was born in Cetinje, Montenegro. He graduated with a degree in comparative literature and theatrology from the Faculty of Philosophy, University of Sarajevo.

Career
Đurković worked as a playwright at the Montenegrin National Theatre and was a director of the Royal Theatre Zetski dom in Cetinje. During the 1990s conflict in former Yugoslavia he lived in the Netherlands as a political asylum seeker.
He is the author of the plays The Family History Writer, Petronius or Methuselahs Enjoy the Eternal Spring, The Fifth Act, Tobelia, Refuse, New Outfit, Cassandra.Clichés, The Tiresias's Lie, Chiara Zorzi, and Medea. He published four collections of poetry: Polyphemus' Tears, Works and days, Still Something Changes, and Selected Poems in Slovene. 
His plays have been produced and/or published in English, Turkish, Bulgarian, Macedonian, Albanian, Slovenian and French. He was the winner of the most prestigious state recognition, 13 July Award.

References

External links
 http://www.etc-cte.org/bop/
 http://bib.irb.hr/prikazi-rad?lang=en&rad=650796
 http://www.atelier-slave.fr/spip.php?article21&lang=fr
 http://www.etc-cte.org/bop_2012/
 http://www.lscg.org/content/respekt-4-9.html
 https://web.archive.org/web/20140218080358/http://www.cnp.me/produkcija/premijera.htm

1952 births
2022 deaths
University of Sarajevo alumni
Writers from Cetinje
Montenegrin poets
Montenegrin dramatists and playwrights
20th-century poets
20th-century dramatists and playwrights
20th-century Montenegrin writers
20th-century male writers
21st-century poets
21st-century dramatists and playwrights
21st-century Montenegrin writers
21st-century male writers
Montenegrin male writers
Male poets
Male dramatists and playwrights